Pan Chengdong (26 May 1934 – 27 December 1997) was a Chinese mathematician who made numerous contributions to number theory, including progress on Goldbach's conjecture. He was vice president of Shandong University and took the role of president from 1986 to 1997.

Born in Suzhou, Jiangsu Province on 26 May 1934, he entered the Department of Mathematics and Mechanics of Peking University in 1952 and obtained a postgraduate degree in 1961 advised by Min Sihe, a student of Edward Charles Titchmarsh. He then went to work at the Department of Mathematics of Shandong University.

He was honored with an Academician of the Chinese Academy of Science in 1991.

Previously, Wang Yuan made progress toward Goldbach’s Conjecture on the distribution of prime numbers.  His result was that for any sufficiently large even number, that number is the sum of two numbers—one a product of at most two primes, the other a product of at most three primes. This case is denoted by (2,3).  In 1962, Pan Chengdong also made progress in proving Goldbach’s conjecture  by proving the (1,5) case independently and the (1,4) case the following year with N.B. Barban and Wang Yuan.

External links

References

1934 births
1997 deaths
20th-century Chinese mathematicians
Educators from Suzhou
Mathematicians from Jiangsu
Members of the Chinese Academy of Sciences
Peking University alumni
Presidents of Shandong University
Scientists from Suzhou